Hosrayel (also spelled Hisrail or Hasrayel) is a municipality in the Byblos District of Keserwan-Jbeil Governorate, Lebanon. It is 44 kilometers north of Beirut. Hosrayel has an average elevation of 220 meters above sea level and a total land area of 259 hectares. Its inhabitants are predominantly Maronite Catholics.

References

Populated places in Byblos District
Maronite Christian communities in Lebanon